The Wooden Box is a box set of Opeth's first three albums: Orchid, Morningrise and My Arms, Your Hearse.

Contents
The records come in a handcrafted wooden box with album details printed/burned on it. The box holds an Opeth logo stencil, six 180g vinyl records (two per album) limited to 200 copies pressed on white vinyl, alternate artwork containing embossed logos and album details printed on transparent paper.

Track listing

Personnel

References

Opeth albums
2009 compilation albums